American singer and songwriter Zola Jesus has released six studio albums, two compilation albums, two split albums, four extended plays and eighteen singles.

Albums

Studio albums

Compilation albums

Split albums

EPs

Singles

Collaborations

References 

Discographies of American artists
Pop music discographies